Savage Justice is a 1988 action film directed by Joey Romero and starring Julia Montgomery and Ruel Vernal. It was shot in the Philippines.

References

External links

1988 films
1988 action films
Philippine action films
1980s English-language films